SS Clan Macneil was a UK steam cargo liner. She was launched in 1921, survived the Second World War and scrapped in 1952. She spent her entire career with Clan Line.

Details
The Ayrshire Dockyard Co Ltd of Irvine, Ayrshire, built a class of six sister ships for Clan Line. Clan Macnab was launched in 1921 and gave her name to the class.

Clan Macneil was launched on 1 December 1921, completed in February 1922 and passed her sea trials on 14 February.

Clan Line named its ships after Scottish clans. Clan MacNeil is a clan centred on the island of Barra.

Dunsmuir and Jackson of Glasgow built Clan Macneils triple-expansion steam engine, which developed 560 NHP. In October 1929 Deutsche Schiff- und Maschinenbau added a Bauer-Wach exhaust steam turbine, which increased her total power to 691 NHP and was designed to increase her fuel economy and speed.

Clan Macneils UK official number was 146281. Her code letters were KLRC until 1933–34, when they were superseded by the call sign GFWP.

Career
Clan Line operated cargo liner services between Britain, India, South Africa and East Africa, and also Australia and the USA.

On 8 August 1937 Clan Macneil collided with the Belgian cargo ship Princess Marie Jose in the North Sea off Dunkirk, France. Five of Princess Marie Joses passengers were seriously injured. Princess Marie Jose beached herself there to avoid sinking, and was refloated on 10 August.

The UK Government requisitioned Clan Macneil on 23 March 1940. The Ministry of War Transport returned her to her owners on 11 MArch 1946. Of the six Clan Macnab-class ships, she was one of only two that survived the Second World War.

Clan Macneil arrived in Port Glasgow on 1 May 1952 to be scrapped by Smith and Houston. Demolition work started the next day.

References

Bibliography

External links

1921 ships
Maritime incidents in 1937
Ships built in Scotland
Ships of the Clan Line
Steamships of the United Kingdom
World War II merchant ships of the United Kingdom